The 2019 Shepherd Rams football team represented Shepherd University as a member of the East Division of the Pennsylvania State Athletic Conference (PSAC) during the 2019 NCAA Division II football season. Led by second-year head coach Ernie McCook, the Rams compiled an overall record of 10–3 with a mark of 6–1 in conference play, placing second in the PSAC's East Division. The Rams played their home games at Ram Stadium in Shepherdstown, West Virginia.

This was Shepherd's first year as a member of the PSAC, having been a member of the Mountain East Conference from 2012 to 2018.

Regular season
The 2019 regular season for the Rams consisted of 10 games against PSAC conference opponents, and one game against Ohio Dominican. The Rams went 92 in the regular season and advanced to the 2019 NCAA Division II football playoffs.

Playoffs
The Rams won their first playoff game, on the road against conference opponent IUP.

The Rams lost their second round playoff game, at PSAC conference opponent Slippery Rock.

Schedule

References

Shepherd
Shepherd Rams football seasons
Shepherd Rams football